The Rise of the Dragon is a companion book by George R. R. Martin, Elio M. García Jr. and Linda Antonsson describing the history of House Targaryen from Aegon Targaryen's conquest of Westeros to the Dance of the Dragons civil war. It was released on October 25, 2022. In contrast to Fire & Blood, Martin described it as "written in a more encyclopedic style similar to The World of Ice & Fire".

References

External links 
  of author George R. R. Martin

2022 books
A Song of Ice and Fire books
Ten Speed Press books
Encyclopedias of fictional worlds
Collaborative books
Works based on American novels